Banished: How Whites Drove Blacks Out of Town in America  is a 2007 documentary film about four of the U.S. cities which violently expelled African-American families in post-Reconstruction America. The film depicts incidents in Texas, Missouri, Georgia, and Indiana that occurred between 1886 and 1923. Banished was screened in competition at the 2007 Sundance Film Festival.

See also

General
Mass racial violence in the United States
Nadir of American race relations
Sundown town

Specific events
1912 racial conflict in Forsyth County, Georgia
Rosewood massacre (1923) / Rosewood (film)
Tulsa race massacre (1921)

References

External links
Banished: American Ethnic Cleansings at PopMatters
 Banished at Working Films
 Banished site for Independent Lens on PBS
 
 

2007 films
American documentary films
Racially motivated violence against African Americans
Riots and civil disorder in the United States
History of African-American civil rights
Documentary films about racism in the United States
Documentary films about African Americans
2007 documentary films
Documentary films about United States history
2000s English-language films
2000s American films